The Lakers–Spurs rivalry is a National Basketball Association (NBA) rivalry between the Los Angeles Lakers and the San Antonio Spurs. The rivalry started in the late 1970s and peaked in the late 1990s and early 2000s. Since 1999, the teams have met in the NBA Playoffs 7 times, with the clubs combining to appear in seven straight NBA Finals from 1999–2005. Additionally, the teams won each NBA Title from 1999–2003 (the Spurs won in 1999 and 2003, while the Lakers won in 2000, 2001, and 2002). From 1999–2004, the rivalry was considered as the NBA's best, as each time the clubs faced each other in the playoffs, the winner advanced to the NBA Finals. The rivalry fell off from 2005–07, with the Lakers missing the playoffs in 2005 and losing in the first round to the Phoenix Suns in 2006 and 2007, but intensified again in 2008 when they met in the Western Conference Finals, and later on, again in the first round of the 2013 Western Conference playoffs. Both teams cemented their status as the NBA dynasties of the 2000s.

As of the end of the 2019–20 season, the Lakers are the only team with a winning overall record against San Antonio.

Background
The Lakers were founded as the Detroit Gems in 1946 before relocating to Minneapolis, Minnesota and renaming themselves the Lakers (Minnesota's nickname is "The Land of 10,000 Lakes"). The club won several titles led by center George Mikan in the 1950s before moving to Los Angeles in 1960. In 1972 they won another championship led by center Wilt Chamberlain and point guard Jerry West. After acquiring center Kareem Abdul-Jabbar in 1975 and point guard Magic Johnson in 1979, the Lakers built a team that won 5 titles in the 1980s. With the retirement of Johnson and Abdul-Jabbar, they struggled in the 1990s. However, in 1996 the club acquired free agent center Shaquille O'Neal and traded with the Charlotte Hornets for newly drafted shooting guard Kobe Bryant. With the two maturing under coach Phil Jackson, the club turned into a contender in the early 2000s.

The Spurs, meanwhile, were founded as the Dallas Chaparrals in the American Basketball Association in 1967 before moving to San Antonio, Texas and renaming themselves the Spurs in 1973. When the ABA disbanded in 1976, the Spurs were one of four teams absorbed into the NBA. Led by prolific scorer George Gervin, the Spurs experienced regular season success in the 1970s and 1980s, but were unable to advance out of the Western Conference playoffs. After struggling in the latter half of the 1980s, they acquired center David Robinson in the 1987 NBA Draft and the club's fortunes improved. Although they were competitive in the mid-1990s, they never advanced to the NBA Finals. In 1997, they acquired power forward Tim Duncan with the first pick in the draft. The 6'11" Duncan combined with the 7' Robinson to form what was dubbed the "Twin Towers" duo.

Rivalry history
Although the Spurs and Lakers have played each other in the Western Conference since 1981, they weren't considered rivals until 1999, when the Spurs swept the Lakers 4–0, eventually winning their first NBA title. They had met in the 1982, 1983, 1986, 1988, and 1995 NBA Playoffs. In both the 1982 and 1983 playoffs, the Gervin-led Spurs made the Western Conference Finals, but the Lakers of Magic Johnson and Kareem Abdul-Jabbar eliminated the Spurs each time, preventing Gervin from reaching the NBA Finals. The Lakers easily swept the Alvin Robertson-led Spurs in the first round of both the 1986 and 1988 playoffs. Then in 1995, the Robinson-led Spurs made the conference finals by eliminating the Lakers, but would lose to the Houston Rockets in that round.

The rivalry intensified with the Lakers' offseason hiring of former Chicago Bulls coach Phil Jackson before the 1999–2000 season. Jackson had previously commented that the Spurs title in 1999 should come with an asterisk. Jackson stated this because the title took place during a lockout-shortened season, and the three-time defending champion Bulls team (which Jackson coached) was dismantled before it was able to defend its 1998 title.

The following season the Lakers finished with the league's best record, and the Spurs struggled down the stretch after Duncan suffered a knee injury. With Duncan out for the playoffs, the Spurs were defeated 3–1 by the Phoenix Suns, themselves missing Jason Kidd and Tom Gugliotta, in the first round. The Lakers, meanwhile, defeated the Indiana Pacers 4–2 in the NBA Finals to win the club's first title since 1988. While the Lakers won the title, there was speculation that the Lakers would not have advanced to the Finals if they had faced the Spurs in the second round of the playoffs. In 2001, the Lakers, having swept the Portland Trail Blazers and Sacramento Kings, exacted revenge for their 1999 sweep by sweeping the Spurs in the Western Conference Finals. The series was very one-sided, with L.A. winning games by 39 and 29 points. They then won their 2nd straight title over the Philadelphia 76ers 4–1.

The teams faced off again in the 2002 Western Conference Semifinals. Again, the Lakers beat the Spurs. This time the Lakers won 4–1, as the Spurs led each game of the series going into the fourth quarter, but won just once. The Lakers went on to sweep the New Jersey Nets in the NBA Finals.

The next year, they played in the 2003 Western Conference Semifinals. This time, the Spurs ended the Lakers' dynasty in 6 and went on to beat the back-to-back Eastern Conference champion Nets in the 2003 NBA Finals. One of the series' crucial moments came when the Lakers' Robert Horry, a well known clutch shooter, missed a potential game-winning 3 in Game 5. With another title won, David Robinson retired after the season. Robert Horry would then sign the Spurs the following season.

In 2004, the teams met again in the Western Conference Semifinals. After the home team won the first 4 games to set the series at 2, the Lakers beat San Antonio on the road in a memorable Game 5. With the Spurs down 72–71 with 5.4 seconds left, Duncan was almost perfectly defended by Shaq and still made an off-balance fadeaway 20-footer to take a 73–72 lead with 0.4 seconds left. After a few timeouts, Derek Fisher received the inbounds pass from Gary Payton and hit a turn-around 18-footer while falling away. Instant replay showed the ball left Fisher's hands with 0.1 seconds left, thus the Lakers escaped with a 74–73 victory. The NBA denied a Spurs protest stating that the clock did not start in time. The Lakers went on to win the series, and advance to the NBA Finals where they lost to the Detroit Pistons.

O'Neal was traded to the Miami Heat in the following offseason, and the Lakers missed the playoffs in 2005. Meanwhile, the Spurs won their third NBA Championship over the defending champion Pistons in a long, hard-fought 7-game series. The rivalry became dormant, as the Bryant-led Lakers started anew with a younger nucleus that lost in the first round in 2006 and 2007. Meanwhile, the Spurs were defeated by the Dallas Mavericks in the 2006 Western Conference Semifinals 4–3, but rebounded in 2007 to win their 4th Title in 9 years.

During the 2007–08 season, Bryant and the rebuilt Lakers reemerged as a contender. With the added help of Pau Gasol, a second-half acquisition from the Memphis Grizzlies, the team received the #1 seed in the West. The Spurs received the #3 seed. They met again in the 2008 Western Conference Finals. In Game 1, the Lakers overcame a 20-point 3rd quarter deficit to win 89-85 en route to defeating the defending champions 4–1 and advance to the NBA Finals, where they lost to the Boston Celtics.

In the 2008–09 and 2009-10 season, they did not meet in the playoffs. The Spurs were eliminated for the first time in the first round and second round by the Dallas Mavericks and Phoenix Suns respectively, while the Lakers went on to win the NBA Championship against the Orlando Magic in 2009 and the Boston Celtics in 2010.

The 2011 Playoffs was the first time since 2006 that neither appeared in the Western Conference Finals and for only the second time since 1999, neither team made the NBA Finals.

A new rivalry was formed with the arrival of Steve Nash and Dwight Howard to the Lakers in 2012. Nash was acquired in a sign-and-trade deal with Phoenix, while Howard was acquired in a blockbuster trade from Orlando Magic that also involved the Philadelphia 76ers and the Denver Nuggets. In their first game of the 2012–13 season, Danny Green hit a game-winner for the Spurs to win 84-82. The Spurs and Lakers met in the first round of the 2013 NBA playoffs, with the Spurs holding home-court advantage as they had a 58-24 record in contrast to the Lakers' 45-37 record. Unfortunately, Kobe Bryant was unable to play in this last series between the two teams due to his torn Achilles tendon suffered in a season win against the Golden State Warriors. Without their star player, the Lakers were swept by the Spurs 4-0. When the Miami Heat faced against the Spurs in the 2013 NBA Finals, a lot of Laker fans went for the Heat, who would eventually defeat them four games to three in the NBA Finals. In 2014, the Spurs and Heat met in the NBA Finals again, with the dominant Spurs beating the Heat in 5 games. As a result of the 2014 victory, Tim Duncan now has as many championships as Kobe Bryant.

On Saturday February 5, Kobe Bryant and the Los Angeles Lakers went to San Antonio, Texas to play the San Antonio Spurs for Bryant's final game there. The Spurs honored Kobe Bryant with a 2½ minute video while the spotlight shone on Kobe, seated on the Lakers bench. The video showed highlight plays of Bryant, and interviews with Coach Greg Popovich, Tim Duncan, Tony Parker and Manu Ginobili, the Spurs players who have faced Kobe during his entire career. The Spurs won the game 106-102 and Kobe finished the game with 25 points and converted just 9 of his 28 shots.

The rivalry flared once more with the arrival of LeBron James and Anthony Davis to the Lakers and DeMar DeRozan to the Spurs, a former Raptors player that was swept by the Cleveland Cavaliers in the 2017-18 playoffs. James, as a member of the Cleveland Cavaliers and the Miami Heat, has met the Spurs in the NBA Finals on three occasions, losing in 2007 and 2014 and winning in 2013. In 2019–20 NBA season, the Spurs missed the playoffs for the first time since 23 years, while the Lakers clinched the Playoffs and won the title that season.

Head to head (through 1976–77 season)

Statistics

Common players
The following players have played for both the Lakers and the Spurs in their careers:
Dennis Rodman - Spurs (–), Lakers
Robert Horry - Lakers (–), Spurs (–)
Ime Udoka - Lakers, Spurs (–)
Shannon Brown - Lakers (–), Spurs 
Pau Gasol - Lakers (–), Spurs (–)
Danny Green - Spurs (–), Lakers
Devontae Cacok - Lakers (–), Spurs
Lonnie Walker IV - Spurs (–), Lakers (–present)
Stanley Johnson - Lakers, Spurs

See also
National Basketball Association rivalries

References

External links
Article on the rivalry on InsideHoops.com

National Basketball Association rivalries
San Antonio Spurs
Los Angeles Lakers